Reminiscences of the Anti-Japanese Guerillas is a collection of memoirs of North Korean guerillas fighting during the 1930s and 1940s in Manchuria against the Japanese. It was used as a textbook for indoctrination until it was effectively replaced by another piece of guerilla literature, Kim Il-sung's autobiography With the Century, in the 1990s. The memoirs were written in order to portray Kim Il-sung as a national liberator, and to strengthen his cult of personality. However, the memoirs are still used as a textbook in ideological workplace study sessions, as well as in other forms of indoctrination. Many of the memoirs have been adapted as movies by the North Korean film industry.

Role of the memoirs and state propaganda

The Party History Institute(당력사연구소) was founded in 1958, and its collection of memoirs, Reminiscences of the Anti-Japanese Guerillas, was published in 1959, when Kim Il-sung's cult of personality was being strengthened after the August Faction Incident. These initiatives were part of the efforts to create and promote Kim Il-sung's activities during World War II as an anti-Japanese myth. High-ranking defector Hwang Jang-yop dated the beginning of the personality cult at the end of the 1960s, when various guerillas disappeared from North Korean partisan literature. Until the 1960s, guerillas like Eulji Mundeok, Kang Gam-chan and Lee Sun-shin were common in North Korean partisan literature. Others like Ahn Chang-ho and Shin Chae-ho were discredited.

In the late 1960s, Kim Jong-il called back all the unofficial guerilla memoirs, and publishing them independently through news media or publishing houses was banned. After the Kapsan Faction Incident in 1967, similar to the August Faction Incident in nature, Kim Jong-il ordered the chapters in Reminiscences of the Anti-Japanese Guerillas written by the conspirators to be deleted. Since then, the Party History Institute would review and edit all memoirs. Hwang accused Kim Jong-il of trying to monopolize the independence struggle for the Kim family. Jae-Cheon Lim argues that in the 1990s, the role of the memoirs as a tool for indoctrination were largely replaced by With the Century.

The memoirs are still commonly used in daily ideological study sessions at workplaces, as they are seen as classic literature of the Workers' Party of Korea. They are also used as ideological study material in universities and in the Korean People's Army. The memoirs are also used in annual mandatory party members' political examinations handled by the party Propaganda and Agitation Department. Repeated failures in the examinations have resulted in local officials being fired.

Release details

In May 1959, the first volume of the memoirs was published for the first time by the Workers' Party of Korea Publishing House. Since then, they have been republished in numerous volumes and editions.

In November 2003, it was announced that the Workers' Party of Korea Publishing House planned to publish 20 volumes of reminiscences by combining earlier published series Reminiscences of the Anti-Japanese Guerillas, Combat Reminiscences of Anti-Japanese Guerillas and For the Freedom and Liberation of the People. The first volume carried 27 chapters of memoirs.

In 2012, the memoirs won the People's Prize in North Korea. Many of the memoirs have since the 1959 release been made into movies, including Comrades! Please Take This Pistol, Fighter on Mt. Chonbo and Story of An Sun Hwa.

The memoirs have been reprinted by University Press of the Pacific in English. Translations exist in Finnish and Swahili.

Select contributors
The following guerillas who entered politics after the war have contributed to the series.

See also

Anti-Japanese resistance volunteers in China
History of North Korea
Korea under Japanese rule
Korean independence movement
Korean nationalist historiography
Northeast Anti-Japanese United Army

References

Works cited

External links
Full text of volumes 1-20 at Uriminzokkiri 

1959 non-fiction books
History books about North Korea
Korean non-fiction books
North Korean books
Political memoirs